Strathkelvin and Bearsden may refer to:

 Strathkelvin and Bearsden (UK Parliament constituency)
 Strathkelvin and Bearsden (Scottish Parliament constituency)